Gabrielle Andrews and Taylor Townsend were the defending champions, having won the event in 2012, but both chose not to defend their title.

Ana Konjuh and Carol Zhao won the tournament, defeating Oleksandra Korashvili and Barbora Krejčíková in the final, 5–7, 6–4, [10–7].

Seeds

Draw

Finals

Top half

Bottom half

External links 
 Draw

Girls' Doubles
Australian Open, 2013 Girls' Doubles